Ordinary Time is the part of the liturgical year in the liturgy of the Roman Rite, which falls outside the two great seasons of Christmastide and Eastertide, or their respective preparatory seasons of Advent and Lent. Ordinary Time thus includes the days between Christmastide and Lent, and between Eastertide and Advent. The liturgical color assigned to Ordinary Time is green. The last Sunday of Ordinary Time is the Solemnity of Christ the King.

The word "ordinary" as used here comes from the ordinal numerals by which the weeks are identified or counted, from the 1st week of Ordinary Time in January to the 34th week that begins toward the end of November.

Roman Rite 
In the ordinary form of the Roman Rite, the Feast of the Baptism of the Lord, which ordinarily occurs on the Sunday after the Solemnity of the Epiphany of the Lord (6 January), begins Ordinary Time and closes the Season of Christmas. The weekdays that follow the Feast of the Baptism of the Lord are reckoned as belonging to the first week of Ordinary Time which continues until the Tuesday that immediately precedes Ash Wednesday. 

After Eastertide the Ordinary Time resumes on the Monday after the Solemnity of Pentecost. In regional calendars where Whitmonday is a Day of Obligation, Ordinary Time and the use of the liturgical colour Green may begin on the following Tuesday.

The decision to treat the whole of Ordinary Time as a unit led to abandonment of the previous terminology, whereby the Sundays of the first period were called Sundays after Epiphany and those of the second period Sundays after Pentecost.

Number of weeks: 33 or 34 
The last Saturday is nominally the XXXIV Saturday, as the second part of the Ordinary Time is counted backwards from the 34th week. 

Depending on where the XXXIV Saturday falls from 26 November to 2 December, the Ordinary Time will have 33 or 34 weeks.

If the XXXIV Saturday falls on 26/27/28/29 November, the Ordinary Time will have 33 weeks.

If the XXXIV Saturday falls on 30 November or 1/2 December, the Ordinary Time will have 34 weeks.

Examples 
Ordinary Time with 33 weeks.

 The liturgical year 2022 ended on 26 Nov.
 The liturgical year 2021 ended on 27 Nov.
 The liturgical year 2020 ended on 28 Nov.
 The liturgical year 2025 ends on 29 Nov.

Ordinary Time with 34 weeks.

 The liturgical year 2024 ends on 30 Nov.
 The liturgical year 2029 ends on 01 Dec.
 The liturgical year 2023 ends on 02 Dec.

Simpler rule 
An other, easier way to say the "33 or 34 rule" follows.

If the following liturgical year starts in November, the previous liturgical year's Ordinary Time will have 33 weeks.

If the following liturgical year starts in December, the previous liturgical year's Ordinary Time will have 34 weeks.

Solemnities, feasts and commemorations 
The celebration of an Ordinary Time weekday gives way to that of any solemnity, feast, or obligatory memorial that falls on the same day, and may optionally be replaced by that of a non-obligatory memorial or of any saint mentioned in the Roman Martyrology for that day.

The solemnities, feasts, and commemorations of the General Roman Calendar which may, according to the Ranking of liturgical days in the Roman Rite, replace a Sunday of the Ordinary time are:  
 Feast of the Presentation of the Lord on 2 February 
 Solemnity of the Most Holy Trinity on the Sunday after Pentecost 
 Solemnity of the Nativity of Saint John the Baptist on 24 June
 Solemnity of Saints Peter and Paul on 29 June
 Feast of the Transfiguration of the Lord on 6 August
 Solemnity of the Assumption of the Blessed Virgin Mary on 15 August
 Feast of the Exaltation of the Holy Cross on 14 September
 Solemnity of All Saints on 1 November
 Commemoration of All the Faithful Departed on 2 November
 Feast of the Dedication of the Basilica of Saint John Lateran in Rome on 9 November 

The Universal Norms on the Liturgical Year and the General Roman Calendar also lists as proper solemnities (which outrank in the relevant church building or community Sundays in Ordinary Time):
 The Solemnity of the principal patron of the place, city, or state
 The Solemnity of the dedication and the anniversary of the dedication of one's own church
 The Solemnity of the title of one's own church
 The Solemnity either of the title or of the founder or of the principal Patron of an Order or Congregation.

Revised Common Lectionary usage 

Following the lead of the liturgical reforms of the Roman Rite, many Protestant churches also adopted the concept of an Ordinary Time  alongside the Revised Common Lectionary, which applies the term to the period between Pentecost and Advent. However, use of the term is not common.

Those that have adopted the Revised Common Lectionary include churches of the Anglican, Methodist, Lutheran, Old Catholic and Reformed traditions.

Some Protestant denominations set off a time at the end of Ordinary Time known as Kingdomtide or Season of End Times. This period can range anywhere from only the three Sundays prior to Christ the King (as in the Wisconsin Synod Lutheran) to 13 or 14 weeks (most notably in the United Methodist Church). The Church of England observes this time between All Saints and Advent Sunday.

In some traditions, what in the Roman Rite is the first period of Ordinary Time is called Epiphanytide (beginning on Epiphany Day in the Anglican Communion and Methodist churches) and from Trinity Sunday to Advent is called Trinitytide.  In the Church of England, Sundays during "Ordinary Time" in this narrower sense are called "Sundays after Trinity", except the final four, which are termed "Sundays before Advent". In the Episcopal Church (United States), it is normal to refer to Sundays after Epiphany and Sundays after Pentecost (not Trinity).

The total number of Sundays varies according to the date of Easter and can range anything from 18 to 23. When there are 23, the Collect and Post-Communion for the 22nd Sunday are taken from the provision for the Third Sunday before Lent.

See also 
 Feria

Notes

Liturgical seasons
Catholic liturgy